Gamble Cone is a cone  south-southeast of Post Office Hill in the Kyle Hills of Ross Island. At the suggestion of P.R. Kyle, it was named by the Advisory Committee on Antarctic Names (2000) after John A. Gamble, a geologist at the Victoria University of Wellington, New Zealand, who participated in three United States Antarctic Program field projects under Kyle's leadership, 1981–82, 1982–83, and 1984–85. He later worked with the New Zealand Antarctic Programme on the West Antarctic Volcano Exploration, 1989–90, a collaborative US–UK–NZ effort in Marie Byrd Land, and did extensive work on xenoliths that occur in volcanic rocks, including work at Cape Crozier and Cape Bird on Ross Island.

References

Volcanoes of Ross Island